Congress in Seville (Spanish: Congreso en Sevilla) is a 1955 Spanish musical film directed by Antonio Román and starring Carmen Sevilla, Fernando Fernán Gómez and Manolo Morán.

It was shot at CEA Studios in Madrid and on location in Seville. The film's sets were designed by the art director Enrique Alarcón.

Plot
After their business in Seville goes bankrupt, Carmen and Paco emigrate to Stockholm, where, while penniless, one must endure the living before returning to their homeland. While in Sweden, Carmen found a job as a dancer while Paco manages to return to Seville. Meanwhile, the dancer Carmen gets into a fight on her job and is being let go. Having some spare cash, she visits the hospital where she gets a plane ticket from Dr. Petersen, a physician who has been invited to a Medical Congress in Seville. Dressed up as him, she tries to make to Seville, but on the plane and at the airport she meets various congressmen and comedy ensues.

Cast
Carmen Sevilla as Carmen Fuentes 
Fernando Fernán Gómez as Dr. Guillermo Kroll 
Manolo Morán as Paco Domínguez 
Fernando Nogueras as Méndez López 
Nicolás D. Perchicot as Chamarilero 
Manolo Gómez Bur as Señor raro 
Gustavo Re as Director of Radio AGA 
Miguel Gómez as Taxi driver 
Teófilo Palou as Dr. Massuto 
Juan Cortés as owner of the winery 
Domingo Rivas as Dr. Van Blucker 
Aníbal Vela as Martín Hidalgo 
José Isbert as Señor deaf and clueless
Carlos Casaravilla as Dr. Sergio Radowsky 
Katie Rolfsen as Dra. Martha Petersen 
Mariano Alcón as Dr. Thomas

References

External links

1955 musical films
Spanish musical films
Films directed by Antonio Román
Films set in Seville
Films scored by Juan Quintero Muñoz
Films with screenplays by Antonio de Lara
Cifesa films
Spanish black-and-white films
1950s Spanish films